The Mississaugua Golf & Country Club is a mixed club featuring an 18-hole championship golf course, curling facilities with six sheets, pro shop and lounge, tennis courts, fitness centre, and an active bridge club.  It was founded in 1906 and is located in south-central Mississauga, Ontario (the spelling difference between the names of the city and the club is intentional).

Built on the site of the Credit Indian Village approximately fifty years after the land was initially expropriated, the course started as 9 holes, designed by Percy Barrett of the Lambton Golf Club.  In 1909, the course was expanded to 18 by George Cumming from the Toronto Golf Club, and in 1919 Donald Ross made several revisions.  The course was lengthened by Stanley Thompson in 1927, to prepare for the 1931 Canadian Open.  It currently plays to par 71, measuring 6,663 yards from the gold tees and 7,115 yards from the back black tees. The club went through a golf course renovation program by rebuilding all of their greens in the latter part of 2007 and ending mid year 2008.

Mississaugua Golf & Country Club has hosted the Canadian Open professional men's championship six times;
 1931 Walter Hagen
 1938 Sam Snead
 1942 Craig Wood
 1951 Jim Ferrier
 1965 Gene Littler
 1974 Bobby Nichols

The club has also hosted many Canadian amateur, women's and senior tournaments.

References

External links
 Mississaugua Golf & Country Club

Golf clubs and courses in Ontario
Sport in Mississauga
Golf clubs and courses designed by Donald Ross
Curling clubs in Canada
1906 establishments in Ontario
Curling in Ontario